This article gives an overview of liberalism and centrism in Estonia. It is limited to liberal and centrist parties with substantial support, mainly proved by having had a representation in parliament. The sign ⇒ denotes another party in that scheme. For inclusion in this scheme it is not necessary that the party has labeled itself as a liberal party.

History
At the beginning of the twentieth century liberal parties emerged and played an important role in Estonia. They lost influence in the 1930s.

After the restoration of independence in 1990, both pragmatic centrist and liberal forces arose. The Estonian Reform Party (Eesti Reformierakond) is a free market liberal party. Despite its liberal international affiliations the Estonian Centre Party (Eesti Keskerakond) is generally not considered a liberal party, so therefore it is not included.

From Estonian Progressive People's Party to National Centre Party
1905: Jaan Tõnisson founded the Estonian Progressive People's Party (Eesti Rahvameelne Eduerakond)
1917: The party is renamed Democratic Party (Demokraatlik Erakond)
1919: The Democratic Party merged with the ⇒ Radical Democratic Party into the Estonian People's Party (Eesti Rahvaerakond)
1931: The Estonian People's Party merged with the Christian People's Party (Kristlik Rahvaerakond) into the United People's Party (Ühendatud Rahvaerakonnad)
1932: This is followed by the merger with the ⇒ Estonian Labour Party (Tööerakond) and the Union of Landlords (Üleriikline Majaomanikkude Seltside Liit) into the National Centre Party
1934: The party is banned

Radical Democratic Party
1917: Konstantin Päts, the later conservative leader, founded the Radical Democratic Party (Radikaal-Demokraatlik Erakond).
1919: The party merged with the ⇒ Democratic Party into the ⇒ Estonian People's Party

Radical Socialist Party / Estonian Labour Party
1917: Inspired by the French Radical Socialist and the Russian Trudoviki the Radical Socialist Party (Radikaalsotsialistlik Erakond) is founded.
1919: The party merged with the Social Travaillist Party into the Estonian Labour Party (Eesti Tööerakond)
1931: The Estonian Labour Party merged into the ⇒ National Centre Party.

From Popular Front to Estonian Centre Party
1988: Edgar Savisaar and Marju Lauristin founded the Popular Front (Rahvarinne) officially aiming at consolidating reform-minded people.
1992: The Popular Front fell apart and Savisaar founded the Estonian People's Centre Party (Eesti Rahva-Keskerakond), which was later renamed the Estonian Centre Party (Eesti Keskerakond).
1996: A faction formed the ⇒ Progressive Party
2004: A faction leaves and joins various parties (see Social Liberals). The liberal and centrist character of the party is often disputed, whereby the party is usually considered a left of centre populist/personalist party.

Estonian Liberal Democratic Party / Estonian Reform Party
1990: Liberals formed the Estonian Liberal Democratic Party (Eesti Liberaal-Demokraatlik Erakond)
1994: The party is the basis for the new Estonian Reform Party (Eesti Reformierakond)

Estonian Coalition Party
1991: Dissident members of Savisaar cabinet (Jaak Tamm), and centrists found the Estonian Coalition Party  (Eesti Koonderakond), led by Tiit Vähi
2000s: The party was disbanded

Progressive Party
1996: A faction of the Estonian Centre Party formed the Progressive Party (Arengupartei)
1999: The party disappeared

Estonia 200
2018: Estonia 200 (Erakond Eesti 200) has been founded.

Liberal leaders
Jaan Tõnisson

See also
 History of Estonia
 Politics of Estonia
 List of political parties in Estonia

Estonia
Political movements in Estonia
Estonia